The particles of the Proto-Indo-European language (PIE) have been reconstructed by modern linguists based on similarities found across all Indo-European languages.

Adverbs

Adverbs used as adpositions
Many particles could be used both as adverbs and postpositions. This is similar to modern languages; compare English He is above in the attic (adverb) and The bird is above the house (preposition). The postpositions became prepositions in the daughter languages except Anatolian, Indo-Iranian and Sabellic; some of the other branches such as Latin and Greek preserve postpositions vestigially.

Reflexes, or descendants of the PIE reconstructed forms in its daughter languages, include the following.

{| class="wikitable" style="background-color:#f0f8f0"
! Particle !! Meaning !! Reflexes
|-
|  || from || Ved. ápa "away, forth", Gk. apó, Lat. ab "from", Alb. pa "without",  Eng. of, off, Hitt. āppa, āppan "behind"
|-
|  || to, by, at || Lat. ad, Osc. adpúd, Umb. ař, Goth. at, ON at, Eng. æt/at, Gm. az/--, Ir. ad/do, Welsh add-, at, Gaul. ad, Phryg. addaket, XMK addai
|-
|  || from, back, again || Lat. at, OCS отъ, Ir. aith-, Welsh ad- "re-", Toch. A atas, Toch. B ate "away",  Gk. atar "however"
|-
|  || on, upon || Av. ana, Gk. ano, Lat. in (in some cases), ON á, Goth. ana, Eng. an/on, Gm. ?/an, Lith. ant
|-
|  || against, at the end, in front of, before || Gk. anti,  Lat. ante, Hitt. hantezzi "first"
|-
|  || off, away, too much, very|| Ved. ava, ' Lat. aut, autem, 'Lith. nuo, Eng. of, off
|-
|  || around (→ both) || Ved. abhi, Av. aiwito, aibi, Pers. abiy/?, Gk. amphi, ON um, Eng. bi/by;  ymbi/umbe (obsolete), Gm. umbi/um; ?/bei,  Lat. ambi, ambo, Gaul. ambi, Ir. imb/um, Welsh am, Toch. āmpi/?, Alb. mbi, Lith. abu, OCS oba, Russ. ob "about", oba "both"
|-
|  || without || OCS без, OPruss. bhe, Ved. bahis "from outwards"
|-
|  || to || Gk. -de, Eng. to, Gm. zu, Lith. da-, OCS do, PER tâ, Welsh i, Ir. do, Luw. anda,
|-
|  || out || Lat. ex, Gk. ἐκ (ek)/ἐξ (eks), Gaul. ex-, Ir. ass/as; acht/; echtar, Russ. из (iz), Alb. jashtë, Oscan eh-, Umbrian ehe-, Lith. iš, Ltv. iz, OPruss. is, Welsh ech-
|-
|  || outside || Gk. ektos
|-
|  || extra || Lat. extra, Welsh eithr "except, besides"
|-
|  || in || Gk. en, Lat. in, Eng. in/in, Gm. in/in, īn/ein-, Ir. i, Welsh yn, Arm. i, Alb. në, OPruss. en, OCS vŭ(n)-,Luw. anda, Carian nt_a, Goth. in, ON í, Ir. in/i, Lith. į, Ltv. iekšā
|-
|-
|  || beyond, over (about quantity), besides|| Lat. et, etiam, Gk. ἔτι, οὐκέτι, Ved. अति (ati), Av. aiti, OPruss. et-, at- , Eng. ed-, edgrow, Gaul. eti, t-ic
|-
|  || near, at, upon, by || Ved. ápi "by, on", Gk. epí "on", Lat. ob "on", Arm. ew "and",Av. aipi, Lith. api-, apie, Alb. afër "near"

|-
|  || without || Khot. anau "without" Osset. aenae Gk. aneu
|-
|  || by, along || Hitt. katta "with, down (+Gen)", Gaul. kanta "with", Gk. katá "down" Welsh gan
|-
|  || with || Lat. cum, Ir. co/?, Welsh cyf-, Goth. ga-
|-
|  || in the middle || Pers., miyan Av. madiiana, Khot. mayana-, Ved. madhyama Lat. medius OPruss. median Goth. miduma "the middle" OCS meždu, Welsh y mewn
|-
|  || under || Ved. adhás, Av. aδairi, Lat. īnfr-ā, Eng. under/under, Arm. ənd,Pers. ?/zēr, ON und, Goth. undar, Gm. untar/unter, Arm. ĕndhup/ĕnthub
|-
|  || down, under || Ved. ní, Eng. ne-ther, Arm. ni, OCS ni-zŭ
|-
|  || now || Hitt. nu, Luw. nanun, Ved. nū, OPers. nūra/?, Pers. æknun/konun/?, Gk. nun, Lat. nunc, ON nū, Goth. nu, Eng. nū/now, Gm. nu/nun, Toch. nuṃ/nano, Lith. nūn, Ltv. nu, OPruss. teinu, OCS нъінѣ (nyne), Alb. tani, Arb. naní (but see the list of conjunctions below)|-
|  || towards, into, at || OCS объ
|-
|  || with, together || Hitt. pe-
|-
|  || around, through || Ved. pári "around, forth", Gk. perí "around", Lat. per "through", OPruss. per, Alb. për, Russ. pere- "through, over"
|-
|  || before, forth, in front of, ahead of || Hitt. pēran "before", prā "toward", Ved. prā, Lat. per, prō, Eng. for/fore-, Gm. ?/vor, Welsh rhy, rhag, er, Lith. per, pro, Alb. para, Pers. pær-/pæri-/par-, Russ. pered
|-
| ||after|| Ved. pascat, Lat. post, Lith. paskui
|-
|  || for (enclitic), for the purpose of || Ved. r̥ OCS ради
|-
| ||through|| Ved. tiras, Lat. trāns, Eng. through, OIr. tar, Welsh tra
|-
|  || above || Ved. upári, Gk. hupér, Lat. s-uper, Eng. over, Ir. for/fara, Welsh gor-, gwar- Arm. (i) ver "up", Alb. sipër, Gm. über 
|-
|  || under, below || Ved. úpa "up to", Gk. hupó "below", Lat. s-ub, Ir. fo/faoi, Welsh go-, gwa-Hitt. upzi, Av. upa, Pers. upa/?, Umb. sub, Osc. sup, ON upp, Goth. iup, Eng. upp/up, Gm. uf/auf, Welsh go, Gaul. voretus, Toch. ?/spe, Lith. po
|-
|}
Untranslated reflexes have the same meaning as the PIE word.

In the following languages, two reflexes separated by a slash mean:
English: Old English / Modern English
German: Old High German / New High German
Irish: Old Irish / Modern Irish
Persian: Old Persian / Modern Persian
Tocharian: Tocharian A / Tocharian B

Negating prefixes (privatives)

Adverbs derived from adjectives
Adverbs derived from adjectives (like English bold-ly, beautiful-ly'') arguably cannot be classified as particles. In Proto-Indo-European, these are simply case forms of adjectives and thus better classified as nouns. An example is  "greatly", a nominative-accusative singular.

Conjunctions
The following conjunctions can be reconstructed:

Interjections
There is only one PIE interjection that can be securely reconstructed; the second is uncertain.

Notes

References

Particle
Parts of speech